Batyr-Murza (Batırmırza) is a rural locality (a selo) in Koktyubinsky Selsoviet, Nogaysky District, Republic of Dagestan, Russia. The population was 624 as of 2010. There are 12 streets.

Geography 
It is located 14 km of from Terekli-Mekteb.

Nationalities 
Nogais live there.

References 

Rural localities in Nogaysky District, Dagestan